Powellism is the name given to the political views of Conservative and Ulster Unionist politician Enoch Powell. They derive from his High Tory and libertarian outlook.

According to the Oxford English Dictionary, the word Powellism was coined by The Economist on 17 July 1965. However, the day before, Iain Macleod had reviewed a book of Powell's speeches entitled A Nation Not Afraid in The Spectator in which he mentioned the word:

Enoch Powell has the finest mind in the House of Commons. The best trained and the most exciting. There is an attitude of mind which can be called "Powellism" and it is excellent that now we have the evidence collected in a book.

The word was originally used to describe Powell's views on economics, and Powell offered his own definition: "[Powellism is] an almost unlimited faith in the ability of the people to get what they want through peace, capital, profit and a competitive market".

Nationalism 
Powell was a romantic British nationalist and viewed the nation state as "the ultimate political reality. There is no political reality beyond it". He believed the British Parliament to be the expression of the British nation and his opposition to British membership of the European Economic Community stemmed from his belief that it would abolish the sovereignty of the British nation state. 

His views on Britain's relations with the rest of the world derived ultimately from the belief in the independent nation state. The United Nations, to Powell, was an "absurdity and a monstrosity" by its very nature because it sought to preserve the international status quo without the use of force but that the "rise and growth and disappearance of nations is mediated by force...Without war the sovereign nation is not conceivable".

Immigration 
Powell's opposition to mass immigration derived from his nationalist outlook. Powell claimed that the children of Commonwealth immigrants to Britain did "not, by being born in England, become an Englishman. In law he becomes a United Kingdom citizen by birth; in fact he is a West Indian or an Asian still". Powell claimed that Commonwealth immigration to Britain post-1945 was "in point of numbers out of all comparison greater than anything these islands have ever experienced before in a thousand years of history". Powell asserted that as the immigration was concentrated in urban areas, the result would be violence: "I do not believe it is in human nature that a country... should passively watch the transformation of whole areas which lie at the heart of it into alien territory". Powell claimed that his warnings were political:

It is the belief that self-identification of each part with the whole is the one essential pre-condition of being a parliamentary nation, and that the massive shift in the composition of the population of the inner metropolis and of major towns and cities of England will produce, not fortuitously or avoidably, but by the sheer inevitabilities of human nature in society, ever increasing and more dangerous alienation.

He further believed that "parliamentary democracy disintegrates when the national homogeneity of the electorate is broken down by a large and sharp alteration in the composition of the population". To prevent "civil war", Powell advocated a system of voluntary repatriation for immigrants and their descendants, and in February 1967, he wrote:

The best I can dare hope for is that by the end of the century we shall not be left with a growing and more menacing phenomenon but with fixed and almost traditional 'foreign' areas in certain towns and cities which will remain as the lasting monument of a moment of national aberration.

Northern Ireland 
Roy Lewis stated that for Powell, the situation in Northern Ireland "went down to the roots of his position on nationhood, on British national identity, on the uniqueness of parliamentary government". Powell considered the unionist majority in Northern Ireland to be "part of the nation which inhabits the rest of the United Kingdom" and that Northern Ireland should remain in the United Kingdom. 

Speaking in March 1971, Powell claimed that "for the past eighteen months a part of the United Kingdom has been under attack from an external enemy assisted by detachments operating inside... when one part of a nation is under attack, the whole is under attack". He claimed that the vocabulary used in the context concealed the truth of the situation: "vocabulary is one of the principal weapons in the enemy's armoury". Those who perpetrated acts of violence, Powell asserted, were not an "extremist" but a criminal and that if their motives were "detaching part of the territory of the United Kingdom and attaching it to a foreign country", they become an "enemy under arms".

Powell considered those who committed crimes because they believed, "however mistaken", that they were thereby helping to safeguard their country's integrity and their right to live under the Crown to be "breaches the peace". Those who committed crimes "with the intention of destroying that integrity and rendering impossible that allegiance" were described as "extremist" and "executing an act of war". Powell also disagreed with the notion that members of the British Army were "glorified policeman", designed solely to keep order between two warring sides. Powell instead argued that they were in Northern Ireland "because an avowed enemy is using force of arms to break down lawful authority... and thereby seize control. The army cannot be 'impartial' towards an enemy".  

Powell, despite earlier supporting the Northern Irish Parliament and even redrawing the Irish border to reduce the number of Northern Ireland's Irish nationalists, advocated that Northern Ireland should be politically integrated with the rest of the United Kingdom, treated no differently from its other constituent parts. He believed that successive British governments, under American pressure, were determined to make Northern Ireland join an all-Ireland state, one way or another.

European Economic Community 
Powell had supported British membership of the EEC in 1961, when then Conservative Prime Minister, Harold Macmillan, applied unsuccessfully for Britain to join, as Powell believed it to be a way to make Britain liberalise its economy. However, Powell changed his mind soon after when investigating the EEC's origins and methods in greater detail, and believed that Britain joining the EEC would extinguish Britain's ability to be a self-governing nation. Powell claimed that the question of British membership of the EEC "must be the question which subtends all others...for – in peace as in war, it is the great, the ultimate, question for any nation". "Independence, the freedom of a self-governing nation", Powell argued, "is in my estimation the highest political good, for which any disadvantage, if need be, and any sacrifice, are a cheap price".

Powell outlined his opposition when the House of Commons debated the European Communities Act 1972:

It shows first that it is an inherent consequence of accession to the Treaty of Rome that this House and Parliament will lose their legislative supremacy. It will no longer be true that law in this country is made only by or with the authority of Parliament...The second consequence... is that this House loses its exclusive control – upon which its power and authority has been built over the centuries – over taxation and expenditure. In future, if we become part of the Community, moneys received in taxation from the citizens of this country will be spent otherwise than upon a vote of this House and without the opportunity... to debate grievance and to call for an account of the way in which those moneys are to be spent. For the first time for centuries it will be true to say that the people of this country are not taxed only upon the authority of the House of Commons. The third consequence... is that the judicial independence of this country has to be given up. In future, if we join the Community, the citizens of this country will not only be subject to laws made elsewhere but the applicability of those laws to them will be adjudicated upon elsewhere; and the law made elsewhere and the adjudication elsewhere will override the law which is made here and the decisions of the courts of this realm.

The EEC question was the issue that would cause Powell to leave the Conservative Party on 23 February 1974, as Conservative Prime Minister, Edward Heath, had taken Britain into the EEC on 1 January 1973 without an electoral mandate from British voters. Powell leaving the Conservative Party came just 5 days before the general election took place. After his resignation, Powell then shocked his former Conservative colleagues by calling on the public to vote for the Labour Party, as Labour were offering a referendum on EEC membership. Powell placed the EEC question above all other matters since it eroded national sovereignty in an unprecedented way that had not been known since the English Reformation; EEC law had primacy over law made in the British Parliament, which Powell considered to be the true representation of the British nation, with the British monarch as its head.

Devolution 
Powell opposed devolution to Scotland and Wales because of his British nationalism and because he believed devolution to be incompatible with the unitary nature of the British state. Powell stated that it was impossible for the same electorate to be represented in two legislative houses unless Britain became a federal state. Powell wanted the British nation to be represented in one parliament. Powell believed that they should become independent sovereign states outside the United Kingdom if the Scottish and Welsh considered themselves to be separate nations from the English and the Northern Irish.

British Empire and the Commonwealth 
Powell had originally supported the British Empire and wanted to keep British rule in India. After he had failed, he opposed British membership in the empire's successor, the Commonwealth of Nations. He believed that by leaving the empire and becoming independent, the new countries' affairs were no longer Britain's responsibility or in its national interest. Powell believed that after the end of the empire, patriotism should be derived from the patria, the nation state, regardless of the racial composition of foreign states.

Mau Mau Rebellion 
Powell was one of the few MPs who campaigned against the brutality of British troops in combating the Mau Mau rebellion.  He called for British troops guilty of atrocities to be punished:

"I would say it is a fearful doctrine, which must recoil upon the heads of those who pronounce it, to stand in judgment on a fellow human being and say, 'Because he was such-and-such, therefore the consequences which would otherwise flow from his death shall not flow.'"

United States 
Powell thought that the United States was Britain's enemy, not its ally. Powell believed that the US was against Northern Ireland being part of the UK because it wanted a united Ireland within NATO to help combat the Soviet Union. Powell thought that Northern Ireland should be integrated with the rest of the UK and treated no differently from the rest of it. He also blamed the US for the dissolution of the British Empire and for the British decline of influence in international affairs.

Soviet Union 
Moreover, despite being a capitalist, Powell also thought that the Soviet Union posed no threat to the UK because of the Soviet government's internalized outlook, and claimed that the UK and Soviet Union were "natural allies" in holding the European balance of power, not foes.

Unilateral nuclear disarmament 
Powell earlier supported British owning their own nuclear weapons. However, after his ministerial career, he rejected the view given by successive British government that nuclear weapons deterred Russia from conquering the countries of Western Europe and that as the nuclear weapons were mainly American, British security rested on "the American alliance and American armament". Powell believed that even if the Soviet Union had wanted to, it would not have dared to invade Western Europe "for one simple overwhelming reason: it would have meant a war they couldn't expect to win" against the United States. Powell asserted that the nuclear deterrent was "a pretend deterrent" and argued that the existence of separate nuclear weapons for France and the United Kingdom showed that they believed that the United States would not risk a nuclear war over Western Europe. He also claimed that they were "victims to their own reasoning" since neither would themselves use nuclear weapons in the event of an invasion because the consequences of nuclear war would be too horrific. Powell supported unilateral nuclear disarmament also because he disagreed with the notion that nuclear weapons prevented nuclear blackmail since Britain would have to choose between "unlimited devastation" or surrender.

Economic views 
Powell was staunchly anti-interventionist in economic and monetary affairs. He believed that business interests should be looked after by the people that best understood thembusinessmennot politicians. Having criticised conventions on business practice organised or funded by the government, he was the first major politician to call for de-nationalision of public services in the 1960s. However, while Powell was very much a monetarist, he also supported the welfare state, the National Health Service, and labour unions.

Social views 
Powell's social views differed from those of his conservative allies in that he supported no-fault divorce and other aspects of the (so-called) permissive society put forth by Labour. Powell supported the maintenance of monarchy, established religion and hereditary peers in governance. He voted to decriminalise homosexuality and did not regard "it as a proper area for the criminal law to operate".

His views on forms of punishment, judiciary and educational were not those of most contemporary or even present-day Conservatives. He described the death penalty as "utterly repugnant" and voted consistently against corporal punishment in schools.

On 11 April 1973, he wrote in The Daily Telegraph:

I should be the last to imply that a Member of Parliament ought to subordinate his judgement of what is wise or right to even the most overwhelming majority of opinion. If he believes a thing harmful, he must not support it; if he thinks it unjust he must denounce it. In those judgements the opinion of those he represents have no  claim over him. But capital punishment is not for me in that category; it is not self-evidently harmful or self-evidently unjust. I cannot therefore deny that in this context a settled and preponderant public demand ought to be taken into account or that at a certain point it would have to prevail. I do not believe that point has been reached: but it would be disingenuous for me to deny that it could exist.

Distinction from related philosophies

Differences with Thatcherism

The former Prime Minister, Margaret Thatcher, based many of her defining policies along the lines of Powell's rhetoric. However, while they shared between them a desire for the denationalization of industries, their methods of going about this were considerably different. Thatcher desired to severely limit the power of trade unions by defeating them in open industrial showdowns, most notably with the miners' strike showdown against the NUM, whereas Powell defended labour unions and desired to build unity with the working class by winning over trade unionists to monetarist policies through logic, intelligence and political arguments that were in opposition to socialist arguments. Furthermore, Thatcher's proposals to limit immigration were certainly not to the extent that Powell had proposed in 1968. While Thatcher intended to greatly reduce the power of the welfare state and national assistance, Powell had no enthusiasm for such methods and defended the welfare state.

The biggest schism of all between Powell and Thatcher, however, lies in foreign affairs. Powell's sentiment on Britain as part of the wider world would be more in line with Salisbury's "splendid isolation" than Thatcher's Atlanticism. Powell was a well-travelled man who spoke over a dozen languages, but his foreign policy of supporting Britain the nation state did not align with the stereotypical view some may hold of a man who was well-travelled and spoke so many languages. While Thatcher was a strong believer in the special relationship with the United States, Powell saw the United States and Britain as rivals, and not as allies. 

Another foreign policy divide between Powell and Thatcher concerned their opinions and timings on the European Economic Community (EEC), as Thatcher was an enthusiastic supporter of Britain being members of the EEC in the 1970s and 1980s, including being one of the figureheads behind the victorious "Yes" campaign for Britain to stay in the EEC during the 1975 referendum, whereas Powell had been one of the figureheads of the losing "No" campaign to leave the EEC during the 1975 referendum. It was not until the late 1980s and into 1990 that Thatcher started expressing her increasing concern about the EEC's project to political and monetary union, whereas this was something that Powell had been warning about since the mid 1960s when he started openly opposing the EEC and the loss of British sovereignty that would result, showing Powell's stronger foresight into the matter.

Powell distanced himself philosophically from Thatcher. Notably, when it was remarked to him that she was a convert to Powellism, Powell replied: "A pity she never understood it!"

Divergence from libertarianism
Ralph Harris of the Institute of Economic Affairs wrote to Powell claiming that his views on immigration were antagonistic to the rest of his generally-libertarian views, but Powell disagreed with that notion.

See also

Notes

Books on Powellism 
Rex Collings (ed.), Reflections of a Statesman: The Writings and Speeches of Enoch Powell (London: Bellew, 1991).
Roy Lewis, Enoch Powell: Principle in Politics (London: Cassell, 1979).
T. E. Utley, Enoch Powell: The Man and his Thinking (London: William Kimber, 1968).
John Wood (ed.), A Nation Not Afraid: The Thinking of Enoch Powell (B. T. Batsford, 1965).

External links 
Article on Powellism
Powell's St. George's Day speech 1961--an example of the nationalism in Powell's thinking

Conservative Party (UK) factions
Enoch Powell
Eponymous political ideologies